Federal Heights is a neighborhood in Salt Lake City, Utah. It is generally considered as the residential area to the east of Virginia Street and to the north of South Temple Street in Salt Lake City. It abuts the Wasatch Mountains to the north, and the University of Utah to the south and east. Federal Heights is one of the more affluent neighborhoods in Salt Lake City, with many of the homes in the area dating to the early 20th century.

The name "Federal Heights" originates from the period between the Mormon settlers' establishment of Salt Lake City in 1847 and Utah's admittance to the United States as a state in 1896. During this period of time, the Federal Government of the United States established Fort Douglas in the foothills of the Wasatch Mountains above Salt Lake City (not far from the present-day neighborhood) in order to keep an eye on the settlers. Through the efforts of Utah's U.S. Senator Thomas Kearns (1901-1905), Fort Douglas became a regimental post. The officers of the fort established their homesteads to the north-east, creating the Federal Heights neighborhood.

Like much of the lower Avenues and Yalecrest areas, Federal Heights is largely made up of early 20th century revivalist style homes, with Tudor, Spanish Colonial, Norman/Romanesque, English Colonial, Moorish, and Mediterranean styles being the most common.

It gained notoriety when Elizabeth Smart disappeared from the neighborhood on June 5, 2002, and was later rescued (March 12, 2003) from her abductors, two homeless adults known as Brian David Mitchell and Wanda Ileen Barzee.

References

External links

Neighborhoods in Salt Lake City